FK MRU Vilnius was a Lithuanian football team. The team plays in the Lithuanian Football Cup.

Current squad

Competition history 

 Lithuania
{|class="wikitable" style="text-align: center"
|-bgcolor="#efefef"
! Season
! Div.
! Pos.
! Pl.
! W
! D
! L
! Goals
! Pts
|-
| 2013
| 3rd
| 3
| 24
| 14
| 7
| 3
| 55–23
| 49
|-
| 2014
| 2nd
| 2
| 24
| 14
| 5
| 5
| 54–19
| 47
|-
| 2015
| 2nd
| 14
| 34
| 9
| 7
| 18
| 46–65
| 34
|}

References

External links
Official website 
Official statistic site  

Football clubs in Lithuania
Football clubs in Vilnius
Sport in Vilnius
2012 establishments in Lithuania
Association football clubs established in 2012